Sangzhi is a county in Hunan Province, China, it is under administration of the prefecture-level city of Zhangjiajie. Located on the northern margin of Hunan, Sangzhi County is bordered to the east by Cili County, to the south by Yongding and Wulingyuan Districts, to the west by Yongshun and Longshan Counties, to the north by Xuan'en and Hefeng Counties of Hubei, Sangzhi is also the home of the Tujia, Miao and Bai people. It is divided into 23 township-level divisions (November 27, 2015), its county seat is Liyuan Town.

History 
Migrant workers from Sangzhi have worked as drillers in the construction boom in the city of Shenzhen. As a result, silicosis has become a local health concern.

Kuzhu Village, with architecture from the Ming and Qing Dynasties, is an example of a village known for its folk music and local cultural traditions.

The former residence of Marshal He Long is located in Sangzhi County's Hongjiaguan Township.

Geography 
Terrain in the county is mountainous. It is home to the Lishui River, the Badagong Mountain National Nature Reserve, and Jiutian Cave.

Because the Lishui River has a high gradient in its upper reaches, floods arrive quickly, with sharp rises in water level. The county has experienced frequent flash flooding and drainage problems in urban areas.

Flood control projects began in the 1980s. Planners seek to raise the county's flood-control standard from  2-year-occurrence to 20-year-occurrence, and resettle households located in vulnerable areas.

"From 2010–2018, cultivated land, forest land, waters, and urban and rural construction land in Sangzhi County increased by 4.91%, 0.03%, 58.99%, and 55.63%, respectively, and grassland decreased by 13.32%."

Rana sangzhiensis is a frog that was described as a new species for science from Sangzhi.

Climate

Administrative divisions
According to the result on adjustment of township-level administrative divisions of Sangzhi County on November 27, 2015, it has 12 towns and 11 townships (five of which are ethnic townships of Bai people)under its jurisdiction. Its county seat is Liyuan. they are:

12 Towns
 Ruitapu, Sangzhi
 Liyuan, Sangzhi
 Lifuta
 Liaojiacun
 Longtanping, Sangzhi: formed by merging the former Sifangxi Township, Kuzhuping Township and the former Longtanping Town
 Wudaoshui, Sangzhi: formed by merging the former Bamaoxi Township and the former Wudaoshui Town
 Renchaoxi, Sangzhi: formed by merging the former Xilian Township, Renchaoxi  Township and 9 villages of the former Baishi Township.
 Guandiping, Sangzhi: formed by merging the former Changtanping Township,  the former Guandiping  Town, 3 villages of the former Baishi Township and Huangshanyu Village of the former Maidiping Township
 Chenjiahe: formed by merging the former Chenjiahe Town, Lianghekou Township, Yanwukou Township and 3 villages of the former Jianjiapo Township.
 Badagongshan: formed by merging the former Badagongshan Township, Xishaping Township and 10 villages of the former Jianjiapo Township.
 Liangshuikou: formed by merging the former Liangshuikou Town and 5 villages of the former Guluoshan Township
 Qiaoziwan: formed by merging the former Qiaoziwan Township and 8 villages of the former Guluoshan Township.

6 Townships
 Zhuyeping
 Kongkeshu
 Shangdongjie
 Hekou, Sangzhi
 Shanghexi
 Shataping, Sangzhi

5 Bai Ethnic townships
 Zoumaping, formed by merging the former Mihu and Zoumaping Townships
 Liujiaping, Sangzhi
 Hongjiaguan, formed by merging the former Daguquan and Hongjiaguan Townships
 Furongqiao, formed by merging the former Linxihe and Furongqiao Townships
 Mahekou: formed by merging the former Mahekou Township and 7 villages of the former Maidiping Township

Notable residents 

 Marshal He Long, a leader of the Long March, attended school in Hongjiaguan Village.

See also
Wanmin
Yujiazui

References

 
County-level divisions of Hunan
Zhangjiajie